Sir James Balfour Paul  (16 November 1846 – 15 September 1931) was the Lord Lyon King of Arms, the officer responsible for heraldry in Scotland, from 1890 until the end of 1926.

Life
Paul was born in Edinburgh, the second son of the Rev John Paul of St Cuthbert's Church, Edinburgh and Margaret Balfour (granddaughter of James Balfour of Pilrig), at their home, 13 George Square, Edinburgh. His great-grandfather was Sir William Moncreiff, 7th Baronet. He was educated at Royal High School and University of Edinburgh.

He was admitted an advocate in 1870. Thereafter, he was Registrar of Friendly Societies (1879–1890), Treasurer of the Faculty of Advocates (1883–1902), and appointed Lord Lyon King of Arms in 1890. He was created a Knight Bachelor in the 1900 New Year Honours list, and received the knighthood on 9 February 1900. Among his works was The Scots Peerage, a nine-volume series published from 1904 to 1914.

He tried two interesting heraldic cases in Court of the Lord Lyon, the first being in 1909, when Sir Colin Macrae claimed the right to use the coat of arms as Chief of the Name of Clan Macrae, which was opposed by Colonel John MacRae-Gilstrap. The second was action brought against Mrs. Fraser Mackenzie by Colonel James Stewart-Mackenzie, 1st Baron Seaforth, in connection with the bearing of arms in right of her father. In the second case, the Lyon's ruling was upheld on appeal by the House of Lords.

Shortly before his retirement in 1926, he was appointed a Knight Commander of the Royal Victorian Order (KCVO) in the 1926 New Year Honours list. He was also admitted an Esquire and then a Commander of the Order of St John of Jerusalem, elected a Fellow of the Society of Antiquaries of Scotland, and was a member of the Royal Societies and University (Edinburgh) Clubs. He was also Secretary of the Order of the Thistle. He gave the Rhind Lectures in 1898, on heraldry.

He resided at 30 Heriot Row, Edinburgh. Sir James married, in 1872, Helen Margaret (d. 20 December 1929), daughter of John Nairne Forman of Staffa (WS). They had four children: three sons and a daughter. One son, John William, also became a heraldic officer, while another, Arthur Forman, became an architect and partner of Robert Rowand Anderson.

Sir James is buried with other family in Dean Cemetery in Edinburgh, in the north section immediately east of the opening in the wall between the original cemetery and the north extension.

Published works 
 History of the Royal Company of Archer (1875)
 (ed.) Record Series of Registrum Magni Sigilli (1882–1883)
 Handbook to the Parliament House (1884)
 Heraldry in relation to Scottish History and Art (1890)
 An Ordinary of Arms Contained in the Public Register of All Arms and Bearings in Scotland (1893) 1st ed., (1903) 2nd ed.
 Memoir and Remains of John M. Gray in 2 vols. (1895)
 (ed.) The Scots Peerage Vol. I (1904), with successive volumes up to Vol. IX (1914)
 (ed.) Accounts of the Lord High Treasurer of Scotland Vols. II–XI, 1900–1916
 Vol. 2: AD 1500–1504. 1900; Vol. 3: AD 1506–1507. 1901; Vol. 4: AD 1507–1513. 1902; Vol. 5: AD 1515–1531. 1903; Vol. 6: AD 1531–1538. 1905; Vol. 7: AD 1538–1541. 1907; Vol. 8: AD 1541–1546. 1908; Vol. 9: AD 1546–1551. 1911; Vol. 10: AD 1551–1559. 1913; Vol. 11: AD 1559–1566. 1916.
 "Ancient Artillery, with some notes on Mons Meg" in The Proceedings of the Society of Antiquaries of Scotland, volume 50, 1915–1916, pps: 191–201
 (ed.) Scottish History Society, Diary of George Ridpath, Minister of Stitchell, 1755–1761 (1922)

Coat of arms

References

Citations

Sources

 Kelly's Handbook to the Titled, Landed, and Official Classes, 1903, London, p. 1156.

Further reading
 – Volume IX contains the index for the other eight volumes.

External links

1846 births
1931 deaths
Scottish knights
Knights Bachelor
Lord Lyon Kings of Arms
Scottish genealogists
Commanders of the Order of St John
Knights Commander of the Royal Victorian Order
Members of the Faculty of Advocates
People educated at the Royal High School, Edinburgh
Alumni of the University of Edinburgh
Lawyers from Edinburgh